West Roxbury Parkway is a historic parkway running from Washington Street in Boston, Massachusetts, where the Enneking Parkway runs south, to Horace James Circle in Brookline, where it meets the Hammond Pond Parkway. The parkway serves as a connector between Stony Brook Reservation and Hammond Pond Reservation (via Hammond Pond Parkway). West Roxbury Parkway was built between 1919 and 1929 and added to the National Register of Historic Places in 2006.  The parkway is distinctive in the roadway system developed by the Metropolitan District Commission beginning around the turn of the 20th century in that it was built in collaboration with the City of Boston, and is maintained by the city.

At the northern end of the Stony Brook Reservation, the parkway runs through Bellevue Hill Park. The boundary roads of Bellevue Hill Park (Bellevue Hill Road, East Border Road, and West Border Road), which flank the parkway, are also listed as contributing properties to the West Roxbury Parkway.

The West Roxbury Parkway also intersects with the Veterans of Foreign Wars Parkway.

History
Although land was taken for the construction of the parkway as early as 1894, construction did not begin on its southernmost section until 1919, when the section from Washington Street to Belgrade Avenue was built.  It was extended to Centre Street in 1920, providing access via that road to the Arnold Arboretum, one of the city's objectives in the development of the parkway.  The segment to Weld Street was completed in 1924, and the last section, to its terminus at Newton Street in Brookline, was completed in 1929.  In 1924 construction of Bellevue Hill Road (originally called West Border Road) was completed.

During the 1930s four rotaries were built on the parkway in order to improve traffic flow with the major cross streets: Centre Street, the VFW Parkway, Grove Street, and Newton Street in Brookline.  The last of these is considered a part of the Hammond Pond Parkway, and does not contribute to this parkway's historic designation.

Major intersections
The entire route is in Boston, Suffolk County.

See also
National Register of Historic Places listings in southern Boston, Massachusetts
National Register of Historic Places listings in Brookline, Massachusetts
National Register of Historic Places listings in Norfolk County, Massachusetts
National Register of Historic Places listings in Suffolk County, Massachusetts

References

Roads on the National Register of Historic Places in Massachusetts
Parkways in Massachusetts
Transportation in Norfolk County, Massachusetts
Transportation in Suffolk County, Massachusetts
Streets in Boston
Brookline, Massachusetts
National Register of Historic Places in Boston
National Register of Historic Places in Brookline, Massachusetts
Historic districts on the National Register of Historic Places in Massachusetts
Parks on the National Register of Historic Places in Massachusetts